James Mason Bower (born February 17, 1954 in Northampton, Massachusetts) is an American neuroscientist and CEO and chairman of the Board of Numedeon Inc., creator of the Whyville.net educational virtual world. He graduated from McQuaid Jesuit High School in Rochester, New York attending Antioch College and Montana State University as an undergraduate and then received his PhD in neurophysiology from the University of Wisconsin–Madison, U.S. in 1982.  From 1984 until 2001, he was a professor at the California Institute of Technology and from 2001 until 2013 he was a professor at the University of Texas Health Science Center at San Antonio. At present he is a professor at Southern Oregon University and the Executive Director of the Pacific Division of the American Association for the Advancement of Science.

Scientific research 
His core scientific research involves computational studies designed to uncover structure / function relations in cortical structures of the mammalian brain, including both those associated with the olfactory system, and the cerebellum. His laboratory uses a wide range of experimental and model based techniques and has pioneered the use of realistic modeling in computational neuroscience,. Bower's former students are now found in scientific institutions around the world

Scientific infrastructure 
He has also been involved in numerous science infrastructure efforts, including establishing and maintaining the GENESIS (software) simulation system. He has also been involved in establishing a number of conferences and meetings, including in 1987 co-founding the Conference on Neural Information Processing Systems (NIPS), Co-founding and directing with Christof Koch for its first 5 years the Methods in Computational Neuroscience Course at the Marine Biological Laboratory in Woods Hole, Massachusetts, starting the European Union's Methods in Computational Neuroscience Course, and also helping to organize the first Latin American Course for Computational Neuroscience (LASCON). He was also one of the founding editors of the Journal of Computational Neuroscience, and the Annual International Meeting in Computational Neuroscience which he directed from 1991 to 2001 and again in 2010.

Efforts in education 
Bower has been involved in educational reform efforts since he was President of the Teen League of Rochester (NY) as a high school student from 1970 - 1971. While at Caltech, he founded and co-directed with his Caltech colleague Jerry Pine Project SEED and then the Caltech Precollege Science Initiative (CAPSI). He has been a member of numerous national advisory groups on education, including within the National Research Council of the National Academy of Sciences, the National Science Foundation and the Society for Neuroscience. He is regarded as one of the leading innovators in on-line game based learning and education.,  as one of the founders of Whyville.net, a recognized innovator in online simulation and game-based learning.  22 years after its founding, Whyville remains one of the top rated learning websites for children.

Business efforts 
Bower is CEO and chairman of the Board of Numedeon Inc. a company he founded in 1998 to develop educationally related virtual worlds. The company's flagship effort, Whyville.net is now one of the largest education sites for young adults on the World Wide Web, with a player base of more than 7 million in 2006. Whyville has been particularly successful in attracting young teens. Whyville continues to be one of the leading sites for innovation in game-based learning design  Because many of Whyville's citizens have stayed active users of the site for many years Whyville has had significant impact on their lives and careers. In 2015, he founded and became CEO of Virtual Worlds IP Inc.

Publications 
The Book of GENESIS: Exploring Realistic Neural Models with the GEneral NEural SImulation System, Springer Verlag, (1998), 
Computational Modeling of Genetic and Biochemical Networks, MIT Press, (2004), 
"Rethinking the Lesser Brain", Scientific American, August 2003.
20 Years of Computational Neuroscience, Springer, (2013),

References

External links
 The Bower Laboratory Homepage
Numedeon Inc. Homepage
Whyville.net Homepage
 GENESIS Distribution and Support Site
Bower's Blog on Educational Game Development

American neuroscientists
Living people
1954 births
American educators
American technology company founders
Web designers